Diann Blakely (June 1, 1957 – August 5, 2014) was an American poet, essayist, editor, and critic.  She taught at Belmont University, Harvard University, Vanderbilt University, led workshops at two Vermont College residencies, and served as senior instructor and the first poet-in-residence at the Harpeth Hall School in Nashville, Tennessee. A "Robert Frost Fellow" at Bread Loaf, she was a Dakin Williams Fellow at the Sewanee Writers' Conference at which she had worked earlier as founding coordinator.

Life and work
Born Harriet Diann Blakely in Anniston, Alabama on June 1, 1957, Blakely graduated with a Bachelor of Arts in art history from the University of the South in 1979, she subsequently received a Master of Arts in literature from Vanderbilt University in 1980 and a Master of Fine Arts from Vermont College in 1989. Her first volume of poetry, Hurricane Walk, was published under the name Diann Blakely Shoaf in 1992. Subsequently, the St. Louis Post Dispatch named it as one of the ten best verse collections published that year. Her second book, Farewell, My Lovelies, published in 2000 and influenced by "noir" shading, was listed as a Choice of the Academy of American Poets' Book Club. Her third volume, Cities of Flesh and the Dead, won Elixir Press's 7th annual publication prize after being distinguished by the Poetry Society of America's Alice Fay di Castagnola Award, given for a year's best manuscript-in-progress. Anthologized in several volumes, including Best American Poetry 2003 and Pushcart Prize Anthologies XIX and XX, Prior to her death, Blakely was working on two new manuscripts entitled Rain in Our Door: Duets with Robert Johnson and Lost Addresses: New and Selected Poems 

Diann Blakely’s much anticipated Lost Addresses: New & Selected Poems was published by Salmon Poetry in February 2017.

Blakely was a former poetry editor at the Antioch Review and at New World Writing and served on Plath Profiles''' board. She contributed essays, poetry, and reviews to that journal and to many other publication, including the Harvard Review, Nashville Scene, Village Voice Media, Pleiades, and Smartish Pace."Diann Blakely." Avatar Review. Retrieved August 25, 2013.

Blakely died in Brunswick, GA, on August 5, 2014 after complications from a chronic lung disorder. She was 57.

Awards
Pushcart Prize (1994, 1995)
Poetry Society of America's Alice Fay di Castagnola Award (1999)

Selected publications

 Rain in Our Door: Duets with Robert Johnson (White Pine Press, 2018) 
 Lost Addresses: New & Selected Poems (Salmon Poetry, 2017)
 Cities of Flesh and the Dead (Elixir Press, 2008)
 Farewell, My Lovelies (Story Line Press, 2000)
 Hurricane Walk (BOA Editions, Ltd., 1992)

 Poems 
 "Walking Blues: Duet with Robert Johnson #31" at Harvard Review
 "Two Poems" at Bomb Magazine
 "The Storm," "Reunion Banquet, Class of '79," and "Chorale" at Levure Littéraire
 "Magi" and "Georgia Pilgrimage" at The Enchanting Verses Literary Review
 "Antonioni’s blow-up" at Dublin Poetry Review
 "Santa Ana," "Charlotte Brontë's Gloves," and "Another Art" at Mezzo Cammin
 "The Story of Their Lives" at New World Writing
 "92 Johnson Avenue, 1985" and "Two Poems" at Plath Profiles
 "Ten Poems" at storySouth
 "Afterwords (IM William Matthews)" at The Best American Poetry
 "Bad Blood" at Verse Daily
 "Dead Shrimp Blues" at The Chronicle of Higher Education
 Archive for Diann Blakely at Chapter 16

 Anthologies 
 Whatever Remembers Us: An Anthology of Alabama Poetry (Negative Capability Press, 2007)
 Best American Poets 2003 (Scribner, 2003)
 Orpheus and Company: Contemporary Poems on Greek Mythology (UPNE, 1999)
 The Movies: Texts, Receptions, Exposures (University of Michigan Press, 1997)
 Pushcart Prize Anthologies XIX and XX (Pushcart Press, 1996 and 1997)
 Lights, Camera, Poetry!: American Movie Poems, The First Hundred Years (Mariner Books, 1996)
 Homewords (University of Tennessee Press, 1986)

 Reviews and essays 
 Harvard Review 
Intruder by Jill Bialosky

 The Best American Poetry 
 The New Black
 Ave Atque Vale: William Matthews by Diann Blakely

 New World Writing 
 She Do the Police In Different Voices
 The Zanesville Bear Cub & the Puritan Tradition

 Nashville Scene 
 Excitable Boys: This year's best books for music lovers

 Plath Profiles 
 Heptonstall Cemetery: A Memoir, A Tribute, A Defense, and A Eulogy
 Review of Heather Clark's The Grief of Influence: Sylvia Plath and Ted Hughes
 Bee-Stung in October 

 Poets.org 
 Women of the New Gen: Refashioning Poetry

 Smartish Pace 
 Jonathan Galassi: Left-Handed; John FitzGerald: The Mind; David St. John: The Auroras

 Swampland 
 In the Sanctuary of Outcasts: A Memoir

 References 

External links
 Author's website
 Archives: Diann Blakely (Nashville Scene)
 Ringing Endorsements: Missing Parsons
 Hélène Cardona, [http://www.theamericanjournalofpoetry.com/v3-blakelytribute.html "Diann Blakely Tribute. Farewell, Our Lovely"]. The American Journal of Poetry. Vol 3, Summer 2017.
 "Diann Blakely of Brunswick, Georgia." Swamp Skirts. April 4, 2013.
 "The Approaching 100th Anniversary of the Harlem Renaissance (Part 1)." Welcome to Harlem. June 28, 2011.
 David Yezzi, "Diann Blakely tours the South." Best American Poetry. April 23, 2010.
 Phebe Davidson, "Keepers: A Review of Adcock, Meek, Kennedy and Blakely". Asheville Poetry Review. Issue 19; Vol. 16, No. 1 (2009). 
 "Cities of Flesh and the Dead, by Diann Blakely". Elixir Press Catalog.  
 Julie Kane, "Diann Blakely. Cities of Flesh and the Dead. Elixir Press". Prairie Schooner: University of Nebraska-Lincoln. Winter 2009. 
 "From gay Confederates to men in space, Southern Festival of Books explores the world between covers". Nashville Scene. October 8, 2009. 
 Al Maginnes, "The Brands of Immortality Offered: Al Maginnes on Diann Blakely's Cities of Flesh and the Dead" . Gently Read Literature. March 1, 2009. 
 "About Cities of Flesh and the Dead by Diann Blakely". Verse Daily, 2008. 
 Jennifer Horne, "Cities of Flesh and the Dead". Alabama Writers' Forum, December 2008. 
 "Diann Blakely - Cities of Flesh and the Dead". Lit Magic. September 2008. 
"Small Press Spotlight: Diann Blakely". National Book Critics Circle. August 29, 2008.
 Greil Marcus, "Real Life Rock Top 10". Salon. May 28, 2002.
 Dan Albergotti, "Fareweil, My Lovelies". First Draft: The Journal of the Alabama Writers' Forum. Vol. 7, No. 3 (Fall 2000), p. 13.
 Marc Stengel, "Listening After Music: Poet Sings the Blues". Nashville Scene. September 8, 1998.

1957 births
2014 deaths
American women poets
American women essayists
Poets from Alabama
People from Anniston, Alabama
Poets from Tennessee
20th-century American essayists
20th-century American poets
20th-century American women writers
21st-century American women